Abplanalp is a Swiss surname.
now also the name of a stop of the Brienz Rothorn Railway.
The settlement is a Walser foundation, first recorded in 1306. At least seasonal use of the area is assumed for the late Roman period, as numerous local toponyms have Latin etymologies. 
The lower part of the settlement was formerly permanently inhabited, known by the name of Husstatt.  It is now a seasonal pasture,
divided into five lots or Stafel:
Usweid, Greesgi, Rinderbiel, Gummi,  and Obristen (also Ober Stafel).
Substantial avalanche defenses were built after the winter 1942/3. 
There is a legend according to which Planalp was completely destroyed by avalanches, the only survivor being an infant boy found floating in its cradle in Lake Brienz.
Since the identity of the infant was unknown, it was given the surname of Abplanalp, ab being Latin for 'from'.
As a Swiss-American surname, Abplanalp has also been simplified to Aplanalp or Planalp.

People with the surname: 
 Fritz Abplanalp (1907–1977), Swiss woodcarver
 Robert Abplanalp (1922–2003), American inventor of the aerosol spray valve

Swiss-German surnames
People from Brienz